, also known by the names , and , was a Japanese film and television director, producer, and screenwriter.

Early life 
Iijima was born on September 3, 1932, in Tokyo Prefecture. After graduating from Tokyo Metropolitan Koishikawa Secondary Education School, he entered the Faculty of Letters at Keio University because he was interested in the playwright Michio Kato. At that time, Kato was teaching at the Department of Japanese Literature, Faculty of Letters at the university, but committed suicide the next year. He chose the Department of English because he lost the significance of advancing to the Department of Japanese Literature.

Filmography

Director 
 Ultra Q (1966)
 Ultraman (1966)
Return of Ultraman (1971) 
 Daigoro vs. Goliath (1972)
 Ultraman Cosmos: The First Contact (2001)
 Homecoming (2011)

Producer 
 My Son! My Son! (1979)
 24 Eyes (1987)

Screenwriter 
 Daigoro vs. Goliath (1972) [as Kitao Senzoku]
 Ultraman Cosmos: The First Contact (2001) [as Kitao Senzoku]
 Homecoming (2011) [as Kitao Senzoku]

References

External links 
 

1932 births
2021 deaths
Japanese film directors
Japanese television directors
Japanese screenwriters
Japanese film producers
People from Tokyo